Scott Sartiano (born October 31, 1974) is an American restaurateur known for co-founding the nightclubs 1Oak, Up & Down, and restaurants Butter and The Darby. In 2020, he opened the private social club Zero Bond, which has been frequented by celebrities including Kim Kardashian, Tom Brady and New York City mayor Eric Adams.

Early life and education 
He was born in Pittsburgh, Pennsylvania to Italian-American and Irish/Polish-American parents. He was raised in Columbia, South Carolina, later moving to New York City to pursue his undergraduate degree at Columbia University, where he played tennis at the collegiate level. He graduated from Columbia in 1997.

Career 
After an injury to his wrist ended his tennis career, Sartiano changed his focus to the hospitality industry. He partnered with Richie Akiva and to open Butter Restaurant in New York City in 2002 and 1Oak lounge in 2007. 1Oak has since expanded to other cities, including Dubai, Las Vegas, and elsewhere.

Other projects by Sartiano include The Darby and Up & Down. The Darby, a restaurant emulating a supper club, opened in 2010, with Alex Guarnaschelli as the executive chef. In 2014, he opened Up & Down, which became popular with celebrities. He split with his business partner in the same year. Sartiano opened a chain of fast-casual restaurants, Broken Coconut, in 2017.

Sartiano's next project, a private social club named Zero Bond, was slated to open in April 2020, but the outbreak of COVID-19 delayed the opening. Zero Bond ultimately opened in October 2020. Sartiano his goals for the space to Fortune as: “I wanted to create a London-style social club in New York that catered to a mixture of people—creatives and actors as well as doctors, bankers, athletes, and more.

Sartiano was appointed to New York City mayor Eric Adams' transition team, and hosted mayor Adams' election night party at Zero Bond.

Sartiano is on the board of trustees for the Metropolitan Museum of Art, a position he was appointed to by Eric Adams.

Personal life 
Sartiano was previously in a relationship with actresses Anne Hathaway, Ashley Olsen, and Jamie-Lynn Sigler. He married Allie Rizzo on October 25, 2014.

References

External links 
Profile at Columbia University website

Living people
1974 births
American restaurateurs
Columbia Lions men's tennis players
21st-century American businesspeople
Columbia College (New York) alumni
People from Columbia, South Carolina
People associated with the Metropolitan Museum of Art